The 1993–94 Welsh Alliance League was the tenth season of the Welsh Alliance League after its establishment in 1984. The league was won by Llangefni Town.

League table

References

External links
Welsh Alliance League

Welsh Alliance League seasons
3